The Royalty is an American indie rock band formed in 2005. Based in El Paso, Texas, the group has released two studio albums and one EP. Victory Records signed the band after the release of their self-titled album. They released their full-length album Lovers in May 2012.

Musical style and themes
The Royalty has been described as having retro influence ranging from the 1960s rock to 1970's soul. Their music has recently been featured on MTV and SpikeTV shows and the band has been tagged as an MTV Buzzworthy artist. Lead singer, Nicole Boudreau's vocal style has been compared to artists like Amy Winehouse and Adele as well as older singers like Etta James.

Band members
Nicole Boudreau – vocals
Jesus Apodaca – guitar
Mike Hernandez – bass guitar
Daniel Marin– keyboards
Joel Quintana – drums

Discography
Albums

EPs
The Royalty - EP (2008)

Videography
"Chinese Fire Drill" (2008)
"How I Like 'Em" (2012)
"Bartender" (2012)
"I Want You" (2012)

References

External links
Official website

Alternative rock groups from Texas
American post-punk music groups
Indie rock musical groups from Texas
Musical quintets
Musical groups established in 2005
Musical groups from El Paso, Texas
Victory Records artists